Ekk or EKK may refer to:

People 
 Ekkasak Buabao (born 1985), Thai footballer
 Ekkaluck Thonghkit (born 1983), Thai footballer
 Nikolai Ekk (1902–1976), Soviet filmmaker
 Oksana Ekk (born 1974), Russian sprinter

Other uses 
 Standard Estonian language

See also 

 EK (disambiguation)
 Eck (disambiguation)
 ECC (disambiguation)
 EC (disambiguation)
 EQ (disambiguation)